Andersonville may refer to:

Places

United States 
 Andersonville, Georgia, site of an American Civil War prisoner of war camp
 Andersonville National Historic Site, Confederate prisoner of war camp in Georgia holding Union soldiers
Andersonville, Chicago, a neighborhood in Chicago, Illinois
Andersonville Commercial Historic District, an historic district in Chicago
Andersonville, Indiana
Andersonville, Michigan
Andersonville, Ohio, an unincorporated community
Andersonville, South Carolina
Andersonville, Tennessee
Andersonville, Virginia
Andersonville, West Virginia

Elsewhere 
Andersonville, New Brunswick, Canada

Other uses
Andersonville (novel), Pulitzer Prize–winning 1956 novel by MacKinlay Kantor
Andersonville (film), 1996 film based on a POW camp prisoner's diary
"Andersonville", a song by Dave Alvin from his 1991 album Blue Blvd

See also
The Andersonville Trial